Oscar Gorton Mink (1930–2004) was professor of curriculum studies in the Department of Curriculum and Instruction at the University of Texas at Austin, USA.

Professional education
Mink held a doctorate in counseling psychology from Cornell University and degrees in mathematics and mining engineering from Brigham Young University and San Bernardino Valley College.

Awards
 Most Learned Article Award from the U.S. Press Association, for research on learned helplessness
 Litterati Award from Litterati Foundation
 American Society for Training and Development award

Publications
Mink published multiple books and over 300 articles.

Books:
 Statistical Concepts; A Basic Program by Jimmy Amos, Foster Lloyd Brown and Oscar G. Mink (1965)
 Developing and Managing Open Organizations: A Model and Methods for Maximizing Organizational Potential by Oscar G. Mink (Jun 1991)
 Groups at Work (Techniques in Training and Performance Development Series) by Oscar G. Mink (Aug 1987)
 Open Organizations: A Model for Effectiveness, Renewal, and Intelligent Change (Jossey-Bass Management by Oscar G. Mink, Barbara P. Mink, Elizabeth A. Downes and Keith Q. Owen (September 27, 1994)
 Developing High Performance People: The Art of Coaching by Oscar Mink, Barbara Mink, and Keith Owen (June 21, 1993)
 Statistical Concepts: A Basic Program (3rd Edition) by Foster Lloyd Brown, Jimmy R. Amos and Oscar G. Mink (January 1995)
 Change at Work: A Comprehensive Management Process for Transforming Organizations (Jossey-Bass Management) by Oscar G. Mink, Pieter W. Esterhuysen, Barbara P. Mink and Keith Q. Owen (November 19, 1993)
 America's problem youth: Education and guidance of the disadvantaged by Oscar G. Mink (1970)
 Holistic Literacy in College Teaching by John E. Roueche and Oscar G. Mink (1980)
 The Behavior Change Process by Oscar G. Mink (1970)

References

External links
 An Oscar Mink Thought Piece
 Memorial at U. Texas
 
 oscar.htm
 Award News-LatestNews-WinningLeadership Award

1930 births
Brigham Young University alumni
2004 deaths
20th-century American educators
University of Texas at Austin faculty